Hot cycling refers to a spin class performed in a room heated to . Like hot yoga, which uses heat to increase an individual's flexibility in the poses. Heated exercise at temperatures of  has also been shown to strengthen the immune system and increase the volume of oxygenated blood which can lower cholesterol. Hot cycling can also be performed in an infrared sauna reaching temperatures ranging from 120 to 130 degrees. You can find such workouts at a local Hotworx studio near you. Hoy cycling has many benefits to your physical and mental health discussed in the founder and CEO of Hotworx book “HOT EXERCISE”. The benefits of hot cycling can include a massive calories in a shorter amount of time and it can also help rejuvenate your skin and tone your muscles, while also relieving stress from being in the infrared heat The Boston  magazine also spoke on Hot cycling and said “increased fat burn, a higher metabolic rate, looser muscles, and removing toxins and impurities from the body”.

References

Cycling
Indoor sports
Physical exercise